Danzyl Bruwer (born 5 November 1976) is a Namibian footballer formerly with Ajax Cape Town FC in the Premier Soccer League of South Africa. A Namibia international, Bruwer was included in the squad in the 1998 African Cup of Nations. In December 2008, Bruwer tested positive for use of an illegal substance. Bruwer did not return to the club to defend himself of the charge, and instead remained in Namibia. Ajax Cape Town then terminated his contract, which had two years remaining on it at the time.

Career
 1995-1998:  F.C. Civics Windhoek
 1998-2001:  Young Ones Windhoek
 2001-2002:  Avendale Athletico
 2002-2003:  African Wanderers
 2003-2006:  F.C. Civics Windhoek
 2006:  Wits University FC
 2006-2008:  Bay United F.C.
 2008-2009  Ajax Cape Town FC

References

1976 births
Living people
Association football goalkeepers
Namibian men's footballers
Namibia international footballers
1998 African Cup of Nations players
Namibian expatriate footballers
Namibian expatriate sportspeople in South Africa
Expatriate soccer players in South Africa
F.C. Civics Windhoek players
Bidvest Wits F.C. players
Cape Town Spurs F.C. players
Bay United F.C. players